David Shiner may refer to:
 David Shiner (clown) (born 1953), American clown, playwright
 David Shiner (politician), Canadian politician